Boris (Boruch) Mendelevich Dorfman (23 May 1923 – 23 March 2022) was a Ukrainian Jewish public figure, writer, scholar of Jewish culture, and social activist.

He authored about 1000 articles on Jewish issues in Yiddish, Russian, Ukrainian, Polish, and German for publications including Birobidzhaner Shtern and Советиш Геймланд. He was one of the founders of Shofar, the first Jewish newspaper in the former USSR.

Dorfman was born in Cahul, Bessarabia on 23 May 1923. He died on 23 March 2022 in Lviv, two months before his 99th birthday, where he resided, and was buried at the local Yaniv cemetery. He was the father of American publicist Michael Dorfman.

Selected articles

References

External links 
 
 
 Boris Dorfman Biography

1923 births
2022 deaths
People from Cahul District
Bessarabian Jews
Ukrainian Jews
Jewish activists
Ukrainian journalists
Yiddish-language journalists
Burials at Yaniv Cemetery